King Solomon Academy is a non-selective, non-denominational, mixed all-through school within the English academy programme,  located in Marylebone, London. It occupies the site of the former Rutherford School.

History 
The Rutherford School was built from 1958 to 1960, designed by the architect Leonard Manasseh, and is a Grade II* listed building.

The primary school opened in September 2007 and the secondary school opened in September 2009. The school is an all-through school with pupils from 3–18 years with the primary school feeding directly into the secondary. It has sixty pupils in each year. The school is partly modelled on the successful KIPP program which originated in the US.

The curriculum focuses on depth before breadth with a strong emphasis on English and Mathematics.

In December 2008, Ofsted conducted a monitoring visit and rated the academy as 'outstanding'. In December 2009 Ofsted conducted a full inspection and rated the school outstanding.

The school is funded by the Department for Education but is operated by Ark schools, a registered charity under English law, and sponsored by parent charity Ark.

The current headmaster of the secondary school is Max Haimendorf, a graduate of St Hugh's College, Oxford who was amongst the first cohort of the Teach First programme.

In 2015, the school was rated as the best non-selective secondary school in England according to the Department for Education GCSE league tables.

See also
 Ark (charity)
 List of schools in the City of Westminster

References

External links
 King Solomon Academy website
 Ark schools website
 Absolute Return for Kids website

Academies in the City of Westminster
Educational institutions established in 2007
Primary schools in the City of Westminster
Secondary schools in the City of Westminster
Ark schools
Grade II* listed buildings in the City of Westminster
2007 establishments in England